These are lists of Blue's Clues episodes:

List of Blue's Clues episodes
List of Blue's Clues & You! episodes